Minster Lovell Priory was a priory in Minster Lovell, Oxfordshire, England. Its current site is lost, though it is thought to have been west of St Kenelm's parish church and Minster Lovell Hall.

References

Monasteries in Oxfordshire